was a Japanese noble of the Nara period. He was the second son of the founder of the Hokke branch of the Fujiwara, the sangi Fujiwara no Fusasaki.

Life 

With the early death of his older brother Fujiwara no Torikai, Nagate became the effective leader of the Hokke.

Immediately after the death of ex-emperor Shōmu in 756, Nagate was promoted directly to chūnagon, skipping sangi entirely.

On the other hand, he remained in conflict with his powerful relative Fujiwara no Nakamaro. After the disinheritance of Crown Prince Funado in 757, he joined with Fujiwara no Toyonari in supporting Prince Shioyaki as Empress Kōken's new heir, but Nakamaro's favored candidate Prince Ōi, the future Emperor Junnin, won out. In 758, Nagate was the only member of a committee to sit out a daijō-kan meeting called by Nakamaro. After 757, Nakamaro controlled the court, and this bad relationship left Nagate in an uncomfortable political position, despite his status as the third most powerful man in the Daijō-kan after Ishikawa no Toshitari and Fun'ya no Kiyomi.

In 764, Fujiwara no Nakamaro rebelled, and Nagate supported the side of Empress Kōken and Dōkyō. After Dōkyō established his power, and after Toyonari's death in 765, Nagate held his position as the most powerful kugyō in the daijō-kan until his death.

Empress Kōken died in 770, and in the ensuing dispute over the heir, Nagate supported Prince Shirakabe, the future Emperor Kōnin.

Nagate died of sickness on March 11, 771, at the age of 58. He was posthumously granted the position of Daijō-daijin on the same day.

Genealogy 

 Father: Fujiwara no Fusasaki
 Mother: Muro no Ōkimi (daughter of Prince Minu)
 Wife: Ōno no Nakachi (daughter of Ōno no Azumabito)
 Wife: (daughter of Fujiwara no Torikai)
 Son: Fujiwara no Ieyori (743–785)
 Wife: (daughter of Fujiwara no Yoshitsugu)
 Son: Fujiwara no Oyori
 Daughter:  (wife of Emperor Kōnin)
 Wife: (unknown)
 Daughter: Wife of Fujiwara no Kosemaro
 Daughter: (?–800) Wife of Fujiwara no Uchimaro

References 

Fujiwara clan
714 births
771 deaths
People of Nara-period Japan